Joseph Robert Wilson (born 16 January 1965) was an English cricketer. Wilson was a right-handed batsman who bowled right-arm medium pace.

Wilson made his debut for Dorset in the 2002 Minor Counties Championship against Cornwall. From 2002 to 2003, Wilson played 10 Minor Counties matches for Dorset, with his final appearance for the county coming against Wiltshire in 2003.

In 2002, Wilson made his List-A debut for Dorset against the Worcestershire Cricket Board in the 1st round of the 2003 Cheltenham & Gloucester Trophy. Wilson made a further List-A appearance for the county against Buckinghamshire in the 1st round of the 2004 Cheltenham & Gloucester Trophy which was played in 2003.

External links
Joseph Wilson at Cricinfo
Joseph Wilson at CricketArchive

1965 births
Living people
Sportspeople from Birkenhead
English cricketers
Dorset cricketers